Acireductone dioxygenase may refer to:

 Acireductone dioxygenase (iron(II)-requiring), an enzyme
 Acireductone dioxygenase (Ni2+-requiring), an enzyme